HMS Campbeltown is a Type 31 frigate of the Royal Navy and the third vessel named after Campbeltown, a town in Argyll and Bute in Scotland. In May 2021, the names of the five planned Type 31 ships were announced by the First Sea Lord. The names were selected to represent key themes that represent the future plans of the Royal Navy and Royal Marines, with Campbeltown after first ship to bear the name, which was pivotal in the St Nazaire raid, a major commando attack on the occupied port of St Nazaire and the destruction of its dry dock in 1942. The plan for the Type 31 project envisages all five units of the class being in service by February 2030.

References

 

Proposed ships of the Royal Navy
Type 31 frigates